Hudoq is a masked dance performed during Erau harvest thanksgiving festival of many of sub-groups of the Dayak ethnic group of East Kalimantan province, Indonesia. 
The Hudoq culture and performance is indigenous among Dayak population of East Kalimantan province, and it is said to have originated from Mahakam Ulu Regency.

Mythology

According to the traditional beliefs of the Bahau, Busang, Modang, Ao’heng, and Penihing people, hudoqs are thirteen crop-destroying pests, including rats, boars, leopards, and crows. In the festival, the Hudoqs are symbolized by dancers who wear masks representing pests and jackets made of pinang (areca palm) or banana tree bark. The entire body is covered with frayed pinang palm leaves. The dance is finished when two human hudoqs come out and chase the pest hudoqs. The duration of the dance is 1–5 hours.

It is arranged from village to village after people dibble the land to grow dry-field rice paddies in September to October every year. They pray so that their fields will grow abundantly.

Gallery

See also

 Kancet Papatai
 Dayak people
 Indonesian Culture
 Ethnic groups in Indonesia

References

Further reading
 Festival Hudoq di Hulu Sungai Mahakam. Potensi Wisata yang Tidak Tergarap. KOMPAS, Saturday, December 8, 2001. Retrieved on August 28, 2007.

Mahakam Ulu Regency
Festivals in Indonesia
Masquerade ceremonies in Asia
Dances of Indonesia
Theatre in Indonesia
Traditional drama and theatre of Indonesia